The Rio Grande de Loíza (English: Great River of Loíza, Grande de Loíza, or just Loíza River) is a river in the island of Puerto Rico. It is the largest river in Puerto Rico by discharge volume. It is situated on the north coast of the island. It flows from south to north and drains into the Atlantic Ocean, a few miles east of San Juan.

It runs through the municipalities of San Lorenzo, Caguas, Gurabo, Trujillo Alto, Carolina, Canóvanas and Loíza, forming the Loíza Lake along its route, making it the second longest river on the island, behind Río de la Plata.

Geography 
The Rio Grande de Loíza basin is the largest in Puerto Rico with an area of 289.9 square miles. The source of the river is located in the Espino barrio of San Lorenzo, Puerto Rico on the eastern slopes of the Sierra de Cayey mountain range, close to Carite State Forest. The river flows northeastwardly through the San Lorenzo batholith, a hilly region of intrusive igneous rock, where it meets with the tributaries of Emajagua and Cayaguas. From here, the river turns northwest towards the Caguas Valley where it meets numerous other rivers and creeks including the Turabo, Gurabo, Bairoa and Cagüitas rivers. North of this, the river is dammed and flows through the reservoir Loíza Lake (also known as Carraízo Lake, after the barrio of Trujillo Alto it is located in). The river finally flows into San Juan's urban area and the Northern Plain of Puerto Rico where it discharges into the Atlantic Ocean.

History
The river is of historical importance due to the number of settlements, cities and towns that were founded along it such as San Lorenzo, Caguas and Trujillo Alto.

In the 1898 Military Notes on Puerto Rico by the U.S. it is written that the "limits of the Loisa River are: On the east, the sierra of Luquillo (situated near the northeast corner of the island); on the south, the sierra of Cayey, and on the west, ramifications of the latter. It rises in the northern slopes of the sierra of Cayey, and, running in a northwest direction for the first half of its course and turning to northeast in the second half, it arrives at Loisa, a port on the northern coast, where it discharges its waters into the Atlantic. During the first part of its course, it is known by the name of Cayagua." The river was commemorated in a poem by Puerto Rican poet Julia de Burgos.

In mid 2018, the United States Army Corps of Engineers announced it would be undertaking a major flood control project of the river, with a budget of $250 million.

List of features

San Lorenzo 

 Espino
 Quebrada Honda
 San Lorenzo (Pueblo)

Gurabo 

 Navarro

Caguas 

 Caguas (Pueblo)

Trujillo Alto 

 Carraízo
Loíza Lake and Carraízo Dam
 Trujillo Alto (Pueblo)

Carolina 

 Carolina (Pueblo)
 Trujillo Bajo

Canóvanas 

 Canóvanas (Pueblo)
 Santa Bárbara

Loíza 

 Loíza (Pueblo)

Gallery

See also
 Puente de Trujillo Alto: NRHP listing in Trujillo Alto, Puerto Rico
 List of rivers of Puerto Rico

References

External links
 USGS Hydrologic Unit Map – Caribbean Region (1974)

Rivers of Puerto Rico